Folgefonna is a collective term for three plateau glaciers in the Hardanger region of Vestland county, Norway. They are located on the Folgefonna peninsula in the municipalities of Ullensvang, Kvinnherad, and Etne. The three glaciers are:
 Nordre (northern) Folgefonna, with an area of 
 Midtre (central) Folgefonna, with an area of 

On 14 May 2005, Folgefonna National Park was established, protecting the glaciers and the surrounding areas.

The glacier is home to a summer skiing resort, located on its northern region. The largest outflow glaciers from Folgefonna are Blomstølskardbreen, Bondhusbreen, and Buarbreen. Since around 1960, Blomstølskardbreen on the southern end of Folgefonna has changed very little. Bondhusbreen and Buerbreen further north were growing in the 1990s, but have been retreating since the year 2000. The glacier is a famous tourist attraction. Most people who visit the town of Odda usually take the walk to Buarbreen (a part of Folgafonna).

The melt-water from this glacier is bottled at source to form the product Isklar. The melt-water also goes down the river from Buarbreen down into the lake Sandvinvatnet.

Name
The first element is folge meaning 'thin layer of snow' and the last element is the finite form of fonn meaning 'mass of snow, glacier made of snow'.

See also
 List of glaciers in Norway
 List of mountains in Norway by prominence

References

Glaciers of Vestland
Ullensvang
Etne
Kvinnherad